Gebuhr is a surname. Notable people with the surname include:
  (born 1942), German archaeologist and prehistorian
 Otto Gebühr (1877–1954), German actor
 Vera Gebuhr (1916–2014), Danish actress

German-language surnames